Three Mile is an unincorporated community in Avery County, North Carolina, United States. The community is located along NC 194 (Three Mile Highway); the name is derived from the distance of three miles between US 19-E to US 221.

References

Unincorporated communities in Avery County, North Carolina
Unincorporated communities in North Carolina